Remarkable Power is a 2008 comedy film directed by Brandon Beckner, who also co-wrote the script. The film features Tom Arnold, Kevin Nealon, Evan Peters, Nora Zehetner, Kip Pardue, Dulé Hill and Johnny Messner. It was filmed between October 9 and November 4, 2006 in Los Angeles.

Cast

Production
Remarkable Power is the name of a self-help book which plays a central role in the film about a late night talk show host who goes through all lengths to bring his canceled show back on the air.

The project was produced by Mykel Denis and Scott Sampilla. Scott Sampilla also co-wrote the script with director and writing partner Brandon Beckner. The project was filmed entirely in Los Angeles.

Release
The film was released as a Direct-to-DVD on February 16, 2010.

References

External links
 

2008 films
2008 comedy films
American comedy films
Films shot in Los Angeles
Films scored by Mark Orton
2000s English-language films
2000s American films